H. C. Milford was an insurance executive and volunteer when he entered politics. First, serving on the St. Louis County planning commission, then as a St. Louis County Councilman for almost 4 terms, He was also a financial consultant, and Republican politician from Missouri. He grew up in Shrewsbury, Missouri, attended Webster Groves High School and the University of Missouri - Columbia.  He served in the Air Force from 1954 until 1958.  He started an Insurance brokerage with his older brother, Doug Milford.  H.C. Milford died on April 30, 2018, at the age of 86.

Political career
Milford became St. Louis County Executive on October 25, 1989 when Gene McNary, serving his fourth term in the position was appointed Commissioner of the Immigration and Naturalization Service by President George H. W. Bush.

As county executive, Milford proposed that St. Louis International Airport be run by an independent authority, rather than the City of St. Louis.  Little more than a year into his role as county executive, Milford decided to stand for re-election in November 1990.  He was defeated by the Democratic nominee, Buzz Westfall, by a margin of 55%-45%.  This defeat ended 28 years of Republican control of the government of St. Louis County, and, as of 2018, made Milford the last Republican to lead the county.

Redevelopment career
Following his defeat, Milford volunteered to serve as economic development director, and financial consultant for economically depressed East St. Louis, Illinois.  Working with newly elected East St. Louis mayor Gordon Bush, Milford lent credibility to several re-development projects and thus helped to attract wary investors to the city.  Of the re-development projects he was involved in, the most visible is the Casino Queen, a riverboat casino on the East St. Louis waterfront of the Mississippi River, and at the time of its construction, a sorely needed source of revenue for the city.  Milford continued to work to improve East St. Louis until at least 2003, commuting there from his home in Webster Groves, Missouri.

Electoral history

References

Missouri Republicans
People from Webster Groves, Missouri
County executives of St. Louis County, Missouri
Living people
1932 births